Published by The Official Charts Company in June 2012 to coincide with both the 60th anniversary of the UK Official Singles Chart and the Queen's Diamond Jubilee. There were twelve artists with more than ten million UK singles sales with Sir Paul McCartney the only artist to achieve this both as part of a group and as a solo artist.

Many of the artists in the list below have both streaming and sales included in their totals. 

 Justin Bieber (30,225,000)
 Coldplay (30,200,000)
Eminem  (30,000,000)
 Madonna (29,345,000)
 Rihanna (27,100,000)
 Michael Jackson (26,995,000)
 Little Mix (23,000,000)
 The Beatles (22,100,000)
 Elton John (21,635,000) 
 Cliff Richard (21,500,000)
 Beyoncé (14,500,000)
Ariana Grande (13,200,000)
 Westlife (12,854,000)
 Queen (12,800,000)
 Elvis Presley (12,600,000)
 David Bowie (12,000,000)
 ABBA (11,300,000)
 Paul McCartney (10,200,000)
 Bee Gees (10,165,000)
 Kylie Minogue (10,100,000)
 The Rolling Stones (10,100,000) 
Rita Ora (9,800,000)
 Taylor Swift (9,600,000) 
 Rod Stewart 
 Take That
 Stevie Wonder
 Whitney Houston (9,400,000)
Imagine Dragons (9,400,000)
 Oasis  (9,079,000)
 Spice Girls (8,500,000)
 George Michael 
 Robbie Williams 
 Britney Spears (7,635,000)
 U2 (7,500,000)
 Shakin' Stevens
 Lady Gaga (7,357,000)
 Status Quo (7,200,000)
 Boyzone (7,100,000)
 Blondie (7,037,000)
 The Black Eyed Peas (7,034,000)
 Boney M (6,859,000)
 Slade (6,856,000)
 Celine Dion
 UB40 (6,600,000)
 Olivia Newton-John 
 Mariah Carey 
 Tom Jones 
 Madness (6,150,00)
 Police (6,100,000)
 Wham! 
 Phil Collins 
 Diana Ross 
 The Jam 
 Bryan Adams 
 Pet Shop Boys 
 David Guetta 
 Adam Ant 
 Duran Duran
 Frank Sinatra 
 Frankie Goes To Hollywood 
 Prince 
 Katy Perry 
 Wet Wet Wet 
 The Everly Brothers 
 The Shadows (not including any with Cliff Richard)
 Pink

References

United Kingdom, Singles
Best selling singles artists of all time